Paul Hanley and Kevin Ullyett were the defending champions, but lost in the first round to Andrei Pavel and Alexander Waske.

Martin Damm and Leander Paes won in the final 6–3, 6–7(5–7), [10–7], against Andrei Pavel and Alexander Waske.

Seeds

  Bob Bryan /  Mike Bryan (quarterfinals, withdrew due to a flu for Bob Bryan)
  Mark Knowles /  Daniel Nestor (quarterfinals)
  Paul Hanley /  Kevin Ullyett (first round)
  Martin Damm /  Leander Paes (champions)

Draw

Draw

External links
 2007 ABN AMRO World Tennis Tournament Main Draw

Doubles
2007 ATP Tour